The Student mobilisation in Brazil in 2016 (Portuguese: Mobilização estudantil no Brasil em 2016) corresponded to a series of demonstrations and occupations in Brazilian secondary schools and universities that intensified during the second half of 2016. The mobilisations were carried out by high school and university students in several states in Brazil.

The demonstrations aimed to stop projects and measures by the state governments of Geraldo Alckmin, Marconi Perillo, José Ivo Sartori, Beto Richa, Luiz Fernando Pezão and the government of then President Michel Temer. The students protested the bills from the "PEC of the spending ceiling" to PEC 241, project "School without a Party", PL 44 and the provisional measure of the New High School.

Possibly inspired by the wave of student mobilisations in São Paulo in 2015, students asked for more investments and better conditions in education for students and teachers as well as the improvement in the quality of school meals and the infrastructure of schools.

See also
 Diretas Ja

References

2016 protests
Protests in Brazil
2016 in Brazil